Gandhi Nagar Jaipur railway station (station code – GADJ) is a railway station in Jaipur. It is located in Bajaj Nagar area of the city. It is close to Tonk Road and Jawahar Lal Nehru Marg (Jaipur) and mainly caters to the southern areas of the city. Many trains to and from Delhi have a stoppage at this station.

This is the first all-woman operated railway station in India. This is a great step toward women's empowerment.

Platform 
The station has two platforms and entry/exit on either side of the station.

Mostly, Train going to Delhi, Gurgaon, Alwar, Kotputli, Ghaziabad, haridwar etc stops at platform no1 and Train coming from these places stops at platform no2 

viceversa, Train going to Ajmer stops at platform no 2 and train coming from Ajmer, stops at platform no 1

Facilities 
The station has current, reservation and tatkal ticket counter. Other amenities available at Gandhi Nagar railway station are one railway over-bridge, two foot over-bridges, semi-covered platforms, waiting seats, toilets, wheel-chair, Digital information screen, parking, etc. However, the station doesn't have any food vending kiosk or cloak room.

Now the station also have facility of escalator on both side so you don't have to climb on stairs.

Important trains 
 Marudhar Express
 Ala Hazrat Express
 Ala Hazrat Express (via Bhildi)
 Pooja Superfast Express
 Ajmer–Amritsar Express
 Malani Express
 Agra Fort Ajmer Intercity Express
 Ala Hazrat Express (via Ahmedabad)
 Jaipur Delhi Sarai Rohilla AC Double Decker Express
 Jaipur Agra Fort Shatabdi Express
 Ranikhet Express
 Allahabad Mathura Express
Jaipur - Chandigarh Intercity

References 

Railway stations in Jaipur
Railway stations in Jaipur district
Jaipur railway division
Year of establishment missing